Stan Maurice Wicks (11 July 1928 – 1983) was an English professional footballer who played for Reading and Chelsea. Wicks won the League Championship in 1955 with Chelsea, making 21 league appearances that season. He was named by manager Ted Drake as one of his best acquisitions for Chelsea.

Wicks retired from football due to injury in 1957 and died from cancer in 1983, at the age of 55.

References

1928 births
1983 deaths
English footballers
Reading F.C. players
Chelsea F.C. players
Deaths from cancer in England
English Football League players
Sportspeople from Reading, Berkshire
London XI players
Association football central defenders
English Football League representative players
Footballers from Berkshire